Gustaf Adolf Schnitt (17 April 1858 – 4 December 1924) was a Finnish sport shooter who competed in the 1912 Summer Olympics.

He was born in Turku and died in Helsinki. In 1912 he was part of the Finnish team which finished fifth in the team clay pigeons event. In the individual trap competition he finished fourth.

References

1858 births
1924 deaths
Finnish male sport shooters
Trap and double trap shooters
Olympic shooters of Finland
Shooters at the 1912 Summer Olympics
Sportspeople from Turku